Ledvice is a town in Teplice District in the Ústí nad Labem Region of the Czech Republic. It has about 500 inhabitants.

Geography
It lies in the Most Basin.

Notable people
Jaromír Bünter (1930–2015), ice hockey player

References

External links

Cities and towns in the Czech Republic
Populated places in Teplice District